Charles Emmett may refer to:
 Charles Emmett, copilot of USAir Flight 427
 Charles Emmett, guest star in the Star Trek Voyager episode "Warlord"
 Charles Emmett (footballer), English professional footballer